Haberlandia rabiusi is a moth in the family Cossidae. It is found in Sierra Leone. The habitat consists of lowland tropical rainforests.

The wingspan is about 21.5 mm. The forewings are ecru-olive with buffy olive lines from the costal margin towards the dorsum. The hindwings are ecru-olive.

Etymology
The species is named in honour of Ernst-Wilhelm Rabius.

References

Natural History Museum Lepidoptera generic names catalog

Moths described in 2011
Metarbelinae
Taxa named by Ingo Lehmann